Sally's Irish Rogue  is a 1958 British comedy film directed by George Pollock and starring Julie Harris, Harry Brogan and Tim Seely.  It was based on the play The New Gossoon by George Shiels, and was released in the U.S. as The Poacher's Daughter. Filming took place at Ardmore Studios in Dublin.

Plot
The film depicts the adventures of an Irish poacher.

Cast
 Julie Harris ...  Sally Hamil
 Harry Brogan ...  Rabit Hamil
 Tim Seely ...  Luke Carey
 Marie Kean ...  Ellen Carey
 Brid Lynch ...  Mag Kehoe
 Eddie Golden ...  Ned Shay
 Philip O'Flynn ...  'Mad' Henly
 Finnuala O'Shannon ...  Biddy Henly
 Noel Magee ...  Seamus Doyle
 Paul Farrell ...  Pub Landlord
 Dermot Kelly ...  McKeefry
 Geoffrey Golden ...  Uncle Peter
 John Hoey ...  Postman
 John Cowley ...  Garage Dealer

References

External links

1958 films
1958 comedy films
Films directed by George Pollock
British comedy films
Films about hunters
Films with screenplays by Patrick Kirwan
British films based on plays
Films shot in Dublin (city)
Poaching
1950s English-language films
1950s British films